Forbidden City Football Club (FC FC) (Simplified Chinese: 紫禁城足球俱乐部) is a Chinese amateur Association Football (soccer) based in Beijing. The club was founded in 2004 and is a not-for profit Voluntary association social club, playing 11 a-side competitive football in the IFFC. Members of the club are national Chinese as well as from other countries, representing a wide expatriate contingent as common in Beijing.

History
Before joining the IFFC League in August 2004, members of Forbidden City FC played for various amateur football clubs in the Beijing Club football 11-aside League, which was disbanded in 2003 during the SARS outbreak and because Clubfootball decided to concentrate on 5-aside football.

FCFC's inaugural match was on tour to Shanghai, to participate in the bi-annual Shanghai Shooters 7-aside competition, where FCFC picked up their first silverware, winning the Plate competition.

League results
In their inaugural year 2004/05, Forbidden City FC finished 4th in the First Division of the IFFC League with 27 points after playing 18 competitive matches, winning 8, drawing 3 and losing 7. In 2005/06 FCFC were champions of the First Division with 46 points, playing 18 games, winning 15, drawing 1, and losing 2.  FCFC therefore gained promotion to the IFFC Premiere Division. In 2006/07 Season, FCFC finished 7th in the Premiere League.  In 2007/08 Season FCFC maintained their year-on-year improvement and stayed in the top echelon of the division the entire season, finishing in 2nd place with 49 points after 22 matches. In 2008/09 Season FCFC had a great start to the season, maintaining top spot over the Christmas break but didn't capitalise on their early wins, finishing 4th at the end of the season, with 42 points over 22 matches. The 2009/10 Season was better again, with Forbidden City FC staying top of the division for the majority of the season, only to fall into 2nd place in the closing week with 55 points out of 22 matches.
The 2010/11 season saw Forbidden City top the Première League of the IFFC with 63 points. FCFC stayed at the top of the division from Game 3 (October 10, 2010) culminating in winning the trophy on Game 22 (May 29, 2011). Congratulations to Forbidden City FC, winning the league in their 5th year in the top flight.

Expansion
In the 2007 season, FCFC management decided to expand the club by creating a second team, which started playing in the IFFC First Division.  This team was named after another truly famous Beijing landmark to become  Summer Palace FC (圆明园).

On Tour
Forbidden City was first set up as a social touring side with our first tour to Shanghai in August 2004 (as explained above).  Since then the club has travelled to Shanghai and Bangkok on numerous occasions to take part in International football tours. Most recently to the "30th Far East Football Tournament 2012" in Bangkok, which was run by German All Stars Bangkok and where Forbidden City football club finished in 6th place in the cup, the team only lost against the eventual tournament winners.

Result table
As of the end of the 2011/12 season. The 2012/13 IFFC League competition kicked off on 9 September 2012

Forbidden City FC final league Standing

Summer Palace FC final league Standing

References

External links
Official Website
Official League website
Team Seasonal Statistics

Football clubs in China
Football clubs in Beijing
2004 establishments in China
Association football clubs established in 2004